Darbnik is a village in the Masis Municipality of the Ararat Province of Armenia. The town was populated by Azerbaijanis before the exodus of Azerbaijanis from Armenia after the outbreak of the Nagorno-Karabakh conflict. In 1988-1989 Armenian refugees from Azerbaijan settled in the village.

References

External links 

Report of the results of the 2001 Armenian Census

Populated places in Ararat Province